Châteaurenard (Provençal) is a commune in the Arles arrondissement, in the Bouches-du-Rhône department, in the Provence-Alpes-Côte d'Azur region, in southern France.

Population

Twin towns
Châteaurenard is twinned with:

  Altenholz, Germany
  Villanova d'Asti, Italy

See also
 Communes of the Bouches-du-Rhône department

References

External links
 Town website

Communes of Bouches-du-Rhône
Bouches-du-Rhône communes articles needing translation from French Wikipedia